STRETCH Assembly Program (STRAP) was the assembler for the IBM 7030 Stretch computer. The first version (STRAP-1) was a subset cross assembler that ran on the IBM 704, IBM 709, and IBM 7090 computers. The final version (STRAP-2) ran natively.

External links
 IBM Reference Manual 704-709-7090 Programming Package for the IBM 7030 Data Processing System (PDF)
 STRAP I - assembler for IBM 7030/709

Assemblers
IBM software
IBM 700/7000 series